Vriitya Aravind (born 11 June 2002) is an Indian-born cricketer who plays for the United Arab Emirates national cricket team. He plays as wicket-keeper batsman for the United Arab Emirates cricket team. In October 2019, he was added to the UAE's squad for the 2019 ICC T20 World Cup Qualifier tournament, replacing Ghulam Shabber. In December 2019, he was named in the One Day International (ODI) squad for the 2019 United Arab Emirates Tri-Nation Series. He made his ODI debut for the UAE, against the United States on 8 December 2019. Later the same month, he was named in the UAE's squad for the 2020 Under-19 Cricket World Cup.

In February 2020, he was named in the UAE's Twenty20 International (T20I) squad for the 2020 ACC Western Region T20 qualifier tournament. He made his T20I debut for the UAE, against Iran, on 23 February 2020.

In March 2022, in the sixth match of the 2022 United Arab Emirates Tri-Nation Series, Aravind scored his first century in ODI cricket, with 115 not out from just 76 balls.

Personal life
Aravind was born in Chennai, India. He studied at Kings School Al Barsha in Dubai. He moved to England in 2020 to attend Loughborough University.

References

External links
 

2002 births
Living people
Emirati cricketers
United Arab Emirates One Day International cricketers
United Arab Emirates Twenty20 International cricketers
Cricketers from Chennai
Indian emigrants to the United Arab Emirates
Indian expatriate sportspeople in the United Arab Emirates